HMS Chesapeake was a Royal Navy screw-propelled 51-gun frigate launched in 1855, with a crew of 510 men.  She saw action during the Second Opium War and there is a memorial to her losses at Southsea, near Portsmouth. She was the flagship of the British China Squadron in 1861.

Admiral of the Fleet, Lord Fisher served in her in 1860.

Notes

References

External links
 

Frigates of the Royal Navy
Ships built in Chatham
1855 ships
Victorian-era frigates of the United Kingdom